Line D is a rapid transit line on the Lyon Metro. It runs east–west underneath the two major rivers of Lyon, France, connecting Vieux Lyon with the Presqu'ile and the Part-Dieu region. Line D commenced operation under human control on 4 September 1991, between Gorge-de-Loup and Grange-Blanche. It was extended to Gare de Vénissieux on 11 December 1992, when it switched to automatic (driverless) operation, also known as MAGGALY (Métro Automatique à Grand Gabarit de l’Agglomération Lyonnaise). On 28 April 1997, the line was extended again to Gare de Vaise.

Being the deepest of the lines in Lyon, it was constructed mainly using boring machines and passes under both rivers, the Rhône and the Saône.

List of stations

 Vaise (connection: SNCF)
 Valmy
 Gorge de Loup (connection: SNCF)
 Vieux Lyon - Cathédrale Saint-Jean (connections: funiculars F1, F2)
 Bellecour (connection: metro A)
 Guillotière - Gabriel Péri (connection: tram T1)
 Saxe-Gambetta (connection: metro B)
 Garibaldi
 Sans Souci
 Monplaisir-Lumière
 Grange Blanche (connections: tram T2, tram T5)
 Laënnec
 Mermoz-Pinel (connection: tram T6)
 Parilly
 Vénissieux (connections: SNCF, tram T4)

Chronology
 9 September 1991: Opening of line D from Gorge de Loup to Grange Blanche
 11 December 1992: Extension from Grange Blanche to Gare de Vénissieux
 28 April 1997: Extension from Gorge de Loup to Gare de Vaise

Rolling stock
Since the opening of the line in 1991, there are 36 MPL 85 trains. The MPL 85 are composed of 2 cars per trainset.

From 2020, only during peak hours, each train could combine two MPL 85 trainsets and form a single train of 4 cars.

In 2016, new MPL 16 trains have been ordered to Alstom. 10 of them will circulate on the line starting from 2023, in addition to MPL 85 trains. The 2 cars of each train will be connected with gangways, and it will be a novelty in Lyon Metro.

The MPL 16 trains won't be able to run on the line D with the current driverless system, MAGGALY. To overcome this problem, the line D will get a new driverless system, the same as the one which will equip the line B starting from 2020, where MPL 16 will circulate too.

References

External links
Transports en Commun Lyonnais (TCL)

D
Rubber-tyred metros
2nd arrondissement of Lyon
3rd arrondissement of Lyon
5th arrondissement of Lyon
7th arrondissement of Lyon
8th arrondissement of Lyon
9th arrondissement of Lyon
Railway lines opened in 1991
Articles containing video clips
1991 establishments in France